The Master Chief Petty Officer of the Navy (MCPON ) is a unique non-commissioned rank and position of office of the United States Navy, which is designated as a special paygrade above E-9. The holder of this position is the most senior enlisted member of the U.S. Navy, equivalent to the Sergeant Major of the Army, Chief Master Sergeant of the Air Force, Sergeant Major of the Marine Corps, Master Chief Petty Officer of the Coast Guard, and Chief Master Sergeant of the Space Force. The holder of this rank and position is the most senior enlisted sailor in the Navy, unless an enlisted sailor is serving as the Senior Enlisted Advisor to the Chairman. The current MCPON is James Honea.

The Master Chief Petty Officer of the Navy is appointed by the Chief of Naval Operations to serve as a spokesperson to address the issues of enlisted personnel to the highest positions in the Navy. As such, they are the senior enlisted advisor to the Chief of Naval Operations (CNO) and to the Chief of Naval Personnel. Their exact duties vary, depending on the CNO, though they generally devote much of their time to traveling throughout the Navy observing training and talking to sailors and their families. Their personnel code is N00D as the senior enlisted advisor to Chief of Naval Operations and PERS-00D in their special advisory capacity to Chief of Naval Personnel/Deputy Chief of Naval Operations (Manpower, Personnel, and Training). In 1988, the MCPON's spouse was made the Ombudsman-at-Large, authorizing them to travel around the fleet with their spouse, representing the interests of the spouses of enlisted members. The MCPON serves an appointed two-year term of office but can be reappointed by the CNO for an additional two-year term. Typically; the MCPON serves two terms. While the MCPON is a non-commissioned officer, this rank is protocoled higher than all rear admirals and equivalent to a vice admiral in billet, seating, transportation, and parking.

Origin
In 1966, the opportunity was given to sailors in the U.S. Navy's two largest areas of concentration, Hampton Roads, Virginia, and San Diego County, California, to voice their concerns, complaints, and recommendations to the top levels of the U.S. Navy. The response was overwhelming; naval leaders realized that they were out of touch with the desires of enlisted sailors. To provide a permanent channel for input from the enlisted force to their senior leadership, the Navy acted on a suggestion to create a "Leading Chief Petty Officer of the Navy" who would have a direct dialogue channel with all enlisted sailors and represent their interests. Initially, the post was known as the Senior Enlisted Advisor of the Navy, and on 13 January 1967 GMCM Delbert Black was selected to serve a four-year term in that capacity. On 28 April of the same year, Black's title was changed to Master Chief Petty Officer of the Navy to bring the Navy in line with the U.S. Marine Corps and U.S. Army, which had created equivalent positions in 1957 and July 1966 respectively. MCPON Black's duties were to the Chief of Naval Personnel. All subsequent MCPONs have reported to both the CNO and CNP.

MCPON rate insignia

During the MCPON's tenure, a third silver star above the gold anchor is added onto the MCPON's collar and cap devices, as well as a rating badge consisting of a perched eagle atop three inverted gold chevrons, one rocker, and three inverted gold stars above the eagle. The MCPON's rating specialty mark is replaced by a single inverted gold star. The MCPON will also wear the Master Chief Petty Officer of the Navy Badge on naval uniforms.

Master Chief Petty Officers of the Navy

Timeline

See also
 Senior Enlisted Advisor to the Chairman of the Joint Chiefs of Staff
 Sergeant Major of the Army
 Sergeant Major of the Marine Corps
 Chief Master Sergeant of the Air Force
 Chief Master Sergeant of the Space Force
 Master Chief Petty Officer of the Coast Guard
 Senior Enlisted Advisor for the National Guard Bureau

References

 Crist, Charlotte D. Winds of Change: The History of the Office of the Master Chief Petty Officer of the Navy 1967–1992. Washington, D.C.: Naval Historical Center, 1992. A joint publication of the Office of the Master Chief Petty Officer of the Navy and the Naval Historical Center which is available through the Government Printing Office and depository libraries.

External links 
 

 
Senior Enlisted Advisor
Marine occupations